Yevgen Buslovych (26 January 1972 – 15 October 2007) was a Ukrainian wrestler who competed in the 2000 Summer Olympics.

References

External links
 

1972 births
2007 deaths
Olympic wrestlers of Ukraine
Wrestlers at the 2000 Summer Olympics
Ukrainian male sport wrestlers
Olympic silver medalists for Ukraine
Olympic medalists in wrestling
Medalists at the 2000 Summer Olympics
Road incident deaths in Ukraine
Sportspeople from Kyiv Oblast